Bufonaria perelegans is a species of sea snail, a marine gastropod mollusk in the frog shellfamily, Bursidae.

Description
Typical shell size of B. perelegans ranges from 65 mm to 70 mm in width and 96 mm to 120 mm in height, making it the largest species of its genus.  Its elongated varices are perfectly aligned along the spires, its surface sculpture is finely gemmate (bud-like), and its overall shape is oblong, compressed dorso-ventrally.  These three morphological features are in keeping with almost all other species in the genus Bufonaria.

Distribution
B. perelegans can be found in Pacific waters off the Philippines, Taiwan, Indonesia, Malaysia and Thailand.

References

External links

Bursidae
Gastropods described in 1987